Douglas Osborne McClure (May 11, 1935February 5, 1995) was an American actor whose career in film and television extended from the 1950s to the 1990s. He is best known for his role as the cowboy Trampas during the entire run from 1962 to 1971 of the series The Virginian and mayor turned police chief Kyle Applegate on Out of this World.

Career
McClure's acting career included such films as Gidget (1959), The Enemy Below, The Unforgiven, and Because They're Young, then he landed the role of Trampas on The Virginian, a role that would make him famous. He also starred:

 As different characters in several episodes in 1957 of Death Valley Days 
 As Flip Flippen in the 1960 television western series Overland Trail, in which he co-starred with William Bendix for 17 episodes
 As Jed Sills in the 1960-1962 CBS television series Checkmate for 70 episodes.
 As C.R. (Christopher Robin) Grover in the sci-fi/detective series Search (1972–1973), in which he rotated the lead with Hugh O'Brian and Anthony Franciosa as a high-tech PROBE agent.
 As Cash Conover, casino owner, co-starring with William Shatner, in the one-season series The Barbary Coast (1975–1976). McClure replaced Dennis Cole, who played the role of Conover in the show's pilot.
 As Mayor Kyle Applegate on the fantasy sitcom Out of This World (1987–1991).

 
McClure was in the third episode "Mr. Denton on Doomsday" of CBS's The Twilight Zone.

In 1962, he was cast as Trampas on NBC's The Virginian. His co-stars throughout the series were James Drury, Roberta Shore, Lee J. Cobb, Randy Boone, Gary Clarke, Clu Gulager, Diane Roter, Charles Bickford, Sara Lane, Tim Matheson, Jeanette Nolan, and John McIntire.

In 1965, he appeared in Shenandoah, a movie directed by Andrew V. McLaglen and starring James Stewart, Glenn Corbett, Patrick Wayne, Katharine Ross, and Rosemary Forsyth.

After The Virginian ended in 1971, McClure was slated to co-star with Bette Davis on a series about a parolee assisting a judge, played by Davis, by doing detective work. The pilot, produced and written by the team of Richard Levinson and William Link, failed to generate interest in the series and was released as a TV movie titled The Judge and Jake Wyler. McClure made another attempt at a television series during the 1972–1973 season by co-starring on SEARCH as a hi-tech investigator, rotating with Anthony Franciosa and Hugh O'Brian, and again in 1975–1976 in The Barbary Coast, co-starring William Shatner (with whom he'd starred in The Virginian episode "The Claim"). He shifted to low-budget science-fiction movies such as At the Earth's Core, The Land That Time Forgot, and The People That Time Forgot, all three based on the novels of Edgar Rice Burroughs. In 1967, he played the Errol Flynn role in a remake of Against All Flags titled The King's Pirate. He was cast in the lead in three adventures: The Longest Hundred Miles, The Birdmen, and State of Division (also known as Death Race). In 1978, he also starred in Warlords of Atlantis. In the 1970s and 1980s, McClure appeared in commercials for Hamms Beer. McClure also appeared as the blonde slave to Jamie Farr's character in the sequel Cannonball Run II (1984).

He also had a cameo role as a poker player in the 1994 remake of Maverick.

In 1994, McClure was awarded a star on the Hollywood Walk of Fame for television at 7065 Hollywood Blvd. It was unveiled in what was his final public appearance.

Death

On February 5, 1995, McClure died at age 59 from lung cancer in Sherman Oaks, California.  On January 8 of that year, the actor was working on an episode of the television series One West Waikiki in Hawaii when he collapsed from an apparent stroke on the set.  He was flown to Los Angeles for hospitalization.  Doctors discovered that the lung cancer McClure had been battling for more than a year had spread to his liver and bones.  McClure was married to his fifth wife at the time of his death. McClure was divorced four times, including twice while he was performing on The Virginian.

In popular culture
The character of Troy McClure on The Simpsons was modeled after McClure and fellow actor Troy Donahue. Mike Reiss, executive producer of The Simpsons, said that Doug McClure's daughter informed him that Doug was a big fan of The Simpsons. She said that while watching an episode Doug saw the character Troy McClure on the show and said, "Are they making fun of me?" Doug said he thought the parody was funny, and his daughters would call him Troy McClure behind his back as a joke.

Filmography

Film

 Friendly Persuasion (1956) – Soldier (uncredited)
 The Enemy Below (1957) – Ens. Merry (uncredited)
 South Pacific (1958) – Pilot in Hospital
 Gidget (1959) – Waikiki
 The Man Who Understood Women (1959) – Director's Assistant (uncredited)
 Because They're Young (1960) – Jim Trent
 The Unforgiven (1960) – Andy Zachary
 The Lively Set (1964) – Chuck Manning
 Shenandoah (1965) – Sam
 Beau Geste (1966) – John Geste
 The Longest Hundred Miles (1967) – Cpl. Steve Bennett
 The King's Pirate (1967) – Lt. Brian Fleming
 Nobody's Perfect (1968) – Doc Willoughby
 Backtrack (1969) – Trampas (archive footage)
 Terror in the Sky (1971 TV movie) – George Spencer
 The Birdmen (1971 TV movie) – Major Harry Cook
 The Death of Me Yet (1971 TV movie) – Edward Young / Paul Towers
 Playmates (1972 TV movie) – Kermit Holvey
 The Judge and Jake Wyler (1972 TV movie) – Jake Wyler
 The Bloody Vultures of Alaska (1973) – Don Rutland
 Death Race (1973 TV movie) – Lt. Del Culpepper
 The Land That Time Forgot (1974) – Bowen Tyler
 Satan's Triangle  (1975 TV movie) – Lt. J. Haig
 What Changed Charley Farthing (1976) – Charley Farthing
 At the Earth's Core (1976) – David Innes
 SST: Death Flight (1977 TV movie) – Hank Fairbanks
 The People That Time Forgot (1977) – Bowen Tyler
 Wild and Wooly (1978 TV movie) – Delaney Burke
 Warlords of Atlantis (1978) – Greg Collinson
 Humanoids from the Deep (1980) – Jim Hill
 Firebird 2015 A.D. (1981) – McVain
 The House Where Evil Dwells (1982) – Alex Curtis
 Cannonball Run II (1984) – The Slapper
 Omega Syndrome (1986) – Detective Milnor
 52 Pick-Up (1986) – Mark Arveson
 Tapeheads (1988) – Sid Tager
 Dark Before Dawn (1988) – Kirkland
 Prime Suspect (1989) – Dr. Brand
 Battling for Baby (1992 TV movie) – David
 Dead Man's Revenge (1994 TV movie) – Granger
 Maverick (1994) – Riverboat Poker Player #3
 Riders in the Storm (1995) – Hamilton Monroe

Television roles

 Death Valley Days   Ganse Taylor in "Fifteen Places to Fame" (1957)
 Lawman – Jed Ryan in "The Visitor" (1959)
 Riverboat – Corporal Jenkins in "The Face of Courage"  (1959)
 U.S. Marshal – Bruce Williams in "The Threat (1959)
 The Twilight Zone – Pete Grant (episode: "Mr. Denton on Doomsday," 1959)
 Coronado 9 – Jimmy Hoke in "The Widow of Kill Cove" (1960)
 Hennesey – Seaman Davies in "Angel Face" (1960)
 Johnny Midnight – Rice in "Mother's Boy" (1960)
 Overland Trail – Frank Flippin (1960)
 Checkmate – Jed Sills (1960–62)
 The Virginian – Trampas (1962–71)
 The Longest Hundred Miles (1967)
 Barbary Coast – Cash Conover (1975)
 Satan's Triangle – Lt. J. Haig (1975)
 Search – C. R. Grover (1972–73)
 Roots – Jemmy Brent (1977)
 The Rebels – Eph Tait (1979)
 The Fall Guy (TV series) five episodes (once as Himself)
 Hardcastle and McCormick (TV series) – Dt. Hamilton (episode: "School For Scandal" 1984)
 Too Close For Comfort (TV series) – David Jenner (episode: "Divorce Chicago Style" 1984)
 Airwolf (TV series) – Darren McBride (episode: "Half-Pint," 1985)
 Murder, She Wrote: "Steal Me a Story" (airdate November 15, 1987)
 Out of This World   – Mayor Kyle Applegate (1987–1991)
 Superboy: "Hollywood"  – Professor Zugar (airdate May 13, 1989)
 B.L. Stryker: "The King of Jazz" - Alexander Ludlow (November 18, 1989)
 Matlock: "The Outcast"  – Elliot Jones (Feb 7, 1992) 
 In the Heat of the Night: "Time's Long Shadow" (1994)
 The Gambler Returns: The Luck of the Draw (1991)

References

External links
 
 
 
 Doug McClure Biography at Movies.com (archived copy)
 Doug McClure at Brian's Drive-In Theater
 Doug McClure's Portrayal of Trampas, and Why He Was "Made for" the Role

1935 births
1995 deaths
20th-century American male actors
American male film actors
American male television actors
American people of English descent
American people of Irish descent
Deaths from lung cancer in California
Male actors from California
Male Western (genre) film actors
People from Greater Los Angeles
Western (genre) television actors